In the context of point-of-sale and accounting systems, the term post void is a transaction which cancels, or deletes entirely, a previously completed transaction.

The distinction is that the transaction being voided is one that was already completed, versus one that is still in the process of being made.

The ability to post void a transaction is normally restricted to supervisory personnel.  Although the capacity to perform such a transaction is not necessarily fraudulent, there are many scenarios of employee theft, embezzlement, and so-on which could be enabled in part by the intentional misuse of this capability.  Auditors and loss prevention departments therefore routinely scrutinize these transactions very closely for this reason.

External links
 United States Patent #5895453, "Method and system for the detection, management and prevention of losses in retail and other environments"

Banking terms